Air Chief Marshal Sir Michael Gordon Beavis,  (13 August 1929 – 7 June 2020) was a Royal Air Force officer who served as Air Officer Commanding-in-Chief Support Command from 1981 to 1984.

RAF career
Educated at Kilburn Grammar School, Beavis joined the Royal Air Force in 1947 and was commissioned two years later. In June 1961 Beavis set the record for the fastest non-stop flight from the UK to Australia which he established by flying a Vulcan from RAF Scampton to RAAF Richmond in just over 20 hours.

He became Officer Commanding No. 10 Squadron flying VC10s in 1966 and Group Captain Flying at RAF Akrotiri in 1968. He was appointed Assistant Director of Defence Policy at the Ministry of Defence in 1971, Senior Air Staff Officer at Headquarters RAF Germany in 1976 and Director General of RAF Training in 1977. He went on to be Commandant of the RAF Staff College, Bracknell in 1980, Air Officer Commanding-in-Chief at Support Command in 1981 and Deputy Commander-in-Chief Allied Forces Central Europe in 1984 before retiring in 1987.

Family
In 1949 he married Joy Marion Jones; they had one son and one daughter. He died in Cyprus on 7 June 2020.

References

|-

|-

1929 births
2020 deaths
Commanders of the Order of the British Empire
People educated at Kilburn Grammar School
Royal Air Force air marshals
Knights Commander of the Order of the Bath
Recipients of the Air Force Cross (United Kingdom)